Lydia Zynnell Zuh (born July 18, 1990) is a Ghanaian fashion icon, actress, writer, producer, television personality and philanthropist who hails from the Volta region of Ghana. She joined the Ghana movie industry in 2004 and has since received several awards for her work including, Glitz Style Awards, City People Entertainment Awards and Golden Movie Awards.

Early life and education 
Zynnell Zuh was born in Accra, Ghana. She had her secondary school education at Wesley Girls Senior High School. And then furthered at University of Ghana where she acquired a bachelor's degree in Geography and Information Studies.

Career 
Zynnell Zuh joined the Ghana Movie Industry in 2004. Her first screen appearance was through the TV series ‘Sticking to the Promise’ by Point Blank Media. The actress, who was discovered by Shirley Frimpong-Manso, shot into fame in 2010 after starring in several television series and movies, including 'Tears of a Smile'. She later ventured into movie productions where she produced When Love Comes Around, which won an award at the 2015 Africa Magic Viewer's Choice awards.

Works 
She produced When Loves Comes Around, Love Regardless and Anniversary.

Philanthropy 
As of 2016, she was the  ambassador for the United Against Child Poverty Campaign, an initiative by the African Rights Initiative International to help eradicate child poverty in Africa. She is also a Patron of Inspire Africa NGO.

Filmography 
She has starred in several movies including:

Adams Apples
Seduction
Single six
When Love comes around
Love Regardless
Anniversary
Just Married
Hire a Man
Shampaign
Deranged
Crazy Lovely Cool (Musical Drama Series)
The Table
Life and Living It
Different Shades of Blue
For Better For War
Wannebe
Deadline

Awards and nominations 
She has won several awards including:

References

1990 births
Living people
21st-century Ghanaian actresses
University of Ghana alumni
African fashion
Ghanaian fashion
Ghanaian television personalities
Ghanaian film actresses
Ghanaian philanthropists
Ghanaian film producers
Ghanaian women film producers
Ghanaian women writers
Ghanaian television actresses